Heartattack and Vine is the seventh studio album by Tom Waits, released on September 9, 1980, and his final album to be released on the Asylum label.

"On the Nickel" was recorded for the Ralph Waite film of the same name. It was later used as the theme song for the 1985 "The Atlanta Child Murders" miniseries. "Heartattack and Vine" was recorded again later by Screamin' Jay Hawkins. In 1993 this version was used without Waits' permission in a Levi's commercial, for which Waits took legal action and won a settlement. Jean-Luc Godard used "Ruby's Arms" in his 1983 film First Name: Carmen. Bruce Springsteen performed "Jersey Girl" live (and was joined onstage by Waits to sing it on August 24, 1981), including it in his retrospective "Live/1975–85".

Reception

Though critical of the album in many respects, including Waits' vocal delivery and the "morbid pathos" of the ballads, Stephen Holden of Rolling Stone wrote that "Tom Waits finds more beauty in the gutter than most people would find in the Garden of Eden," and referred to him as a "unique and lovable minor talent."

The album was included in the book 1001 Albums You Must Hear Before You Die.

Track listing
All songs written by Tom Waits.

Side One

Side Two

Personnel
Tom Waits - vocals, electric guitar, piano
 Bob Alcivar – string arrangement, orchestral arrangement, conductor
 Ronnie Barron – Hammond organ, piano
 Roland Bautista – electric guitar, twelve-string guitar
 Greg Cohen – bass
 Victor Feldman – percussion, chimes, glockenspiel
 Jim Hughart – bass
 Plas Johnson – tenor saxophone, baritone saxophone
 Michael Lang – piano
 Larry Taylor – bass
 "Big John" Thomassie – drums
 Jerry Yester – orchestral arrangement, conductor

Charts

References

External links

Heartattack and Vine (Adobe Flash) at Spotify (streamed copy where licensed)

Tom Waits albums
1980 albums
Asylum Records albums
Albums produced by Bones Howe